Colin Strang may refer to:
Colin Strang (politician), Canadian politician
Colin Strang (footballer) (1910–1946), Australian rules footballer
Colin Strang, 2nd Baron Strang (1922–2014), British philosopher